Affies Park, formerly  Windhoek Afrikaans Primary School Ground, is a cricket ground in Windhoek, Namibia.  The first recorded match on the ground was in 2014. It was used as a venue for matches in the 2015 ICC World Cricket League Division Two tournament.

References

External links
Affies Park, Windhoek at CricketArchive

Cricket grounds in Namibia
Buildings and structures in Windhoek
2014 establishments in Namibia